Donna DeLory is the debut album by American singer and songwriter Donna de Lory, released in 1992 by MCA Records. Three singles were released from the album: "Praying for Love," "Just a Dream," and "Think It Over." The second single charted in the United Kingdom and became a top ten hit in the United States on the Dance Club Songs chart.

Track listing

Personnel
Donna DeLory: Main Vocals, Vocal Backing
Stevie Lange, Madonna, "Angel Voices" Boys Choir, Danny Peck, Nikki Harris: Vocal Backing
Danny Bordeaux, Morris Michael, Bruce Gaitsch, Dann Huff, Tim Pierce: Guitars
Andy Duncan: Percussion
Brad Cole, Rick Jude, Stephen Hague, Patrick Leonard: Keyboards
Paul Trudeau: Piano
Matt Sherrod: Keyboards, Drums, Percussion
Guy Pratt, Deon Estus, Brad Willard: Bass
Denny Fongheiser, John Robinson: Drums

References 

1992 debut albums
Albums produced by Madonna
Albums produced by Patrick Leonard
Albums produced by Stephen Hague
Donna De Lory albums
MCA Records albums